Gastrolobium stenophyllum, commonly known as narrow-leaved poison, is a flowering plant in the family Fabaceae and is endemic to Western Australia. It is a bushy, upright shrub with orange, pink and red flowers. Flowering occurs from September to December or January to February. It grows at the base of outcrops, near rivers, in heath and shrubland and in sandy locations.

Taxonomy and naming
Narrow-leaved poison was first formally described by Nikolai Turczaninow and the description was published in Bulletin de la Société Impériale des Naturalistes de Moscou. The specific epithet (stenophyllum) means "leaved".

References 

Plants described in 1853
Taxa named by Nikolai Turczaninow
stenophyllum